Ramiz Delalić (15 February 196327 June 2007), widely known by his nickname Ćelo, was a Bosnian gangster and warlord, commander of the 9th Mountain Brigade in Sarajevo. He was one of several prominent underworld figures engaged by the Party of Democratic Action in preparations for the war in Bosnia and Herzegovina. Delalić gained notoriety as the main suspect who stood trial before a local court for the killing of Nikola Gardović on 1 March 1992.

Activities
Delalić, along with Mušan "Caco" Topalović were two of the criminals who helped to organize Bosniak paramilitaries in Sarajevo. In addition to guarding key positions on Mount Trebević, their gangs "requisitioned" private vehicles; kidnapped men to dig trenches at the front; murdered, raped and robbed with impunity.

Despite the stories surrounding him later during the war, namely his racketeering and extortion rings, his acts during the wartime were still considered far less controversial when compared to other local warlords, such as Jusuf "Juka" Prazina. Unlike Prazina and some other local gangsters, Delalić remained loyal and obedient to official Bosnian political and military authorities through the entire war-period, and it is even assumed that he was very close with Bosnian president Alija Izetbegović.

Sarajevo wedding attack
On 1 March 1992, a Bosnian Serb Christian wedding procession in front of the Old Church in Sarajevo's old quarter of Baščaršija was attacked, resulting in death of the father of the groom, Nikola Gardović, and the wounding of a Serbian Orthodox priest. Delalić was identified by eyewitnesses as the shooter. However, Bosnian Muslim authorities made little effort to locate and prosecute him. On 8 December 2004, Delalić was charged with one count of first degree murder in relation to the wedding attack. Delalić was shot and killed by unidentified gunmen in Sarajevo before the completion of his trial.

Death
Delalić was gunned down at the entrance to his apartment building in the center of Sarajevo, on 27 June 2007. The killer waited for Delalić and fired at him on two occasions, each time with multiple shots. Immediately after the shooting, an ambulance arrived, though doctors pronounced Delalić dead shortly after. Delalić was buried in the Kovači Cemetery, Sarajevo.

See also
Ismet "Ćelo" Bajramović

Notes

References

1963 births
2007 deaths
Bosniaks of Serbia
People from Priboj
Bosnia and Herzegovina gangsters
Army of the Republic of Bosnia and Herzegovina soldiers
Bosnia and Herzegovina murder victims
People murdered in Bosnia and Herzegovina
Deaths by firearm in Bosnia and Herzegovina
People acquitted of murder
Serbian expatriates in Bosnia and Herzegovina
2007 crimes in Bosnia and Herzegovina
2007 murders in Europe
2000s murders in Bosnia and Herzegovina